Bidgeemia is a  rural community in the central part of the Riverina.  It is situated by road, about nineteen kilometres west of Urangeline East and twenty-one kilometres east of Urana.

Bidgeemia Public School closed in 1972 but there still exists a public Hall and a shared church, which recently held its last service. Bidgeemia Post Office opened on 1 November 1922 and closed in 1955.

References

The Bidgeemia public School closed in 1972 and the building was moved away. There still exists a public hall and a "shared" church which recently held its last service. (May 2012) There is also a galvanised iron shed which houses the Bidgeemia Fire Brigade's fire engine.

Towns in the Riverina
Towns in New South Wales